Duncan Na'awi is a Papua New Guinean rugby league footballer who represented Papua New Guinea in the 2000 World Cup.

Playing career
Na'awi played in the Queensland Cup for the Redcliffe Dolphins in 2000 and the Wynnum Manly Seagulls in 2001.

He played eight test matches for Papua New Guinea in those two years, including four at the 2000 World Cup.

In 2009 he played for the Cairns Kangaroos in the Cairns District Rugby League.

References

Living people
Papua New Guinean rugby league players
Papua New Guinean sportsmen
Papua New Guinea national rugby league team players
1978 births
Place of birth missing (living people)
Rugby league locks
Rugby league second-rows
Wynnum Manly Seagulls players
Redcliffe Dolphins players
Rugby league centres
Papua New Guinean expatriate rugby league players
Expatriate rugby league players in Australia
Papua New Guinean expatriate sportspeople in Australia